Slot insulation is the common name for shielding material used for the rotor inside a power generator. The slot insulation process for electric motors provides a barrier between the copper wirings and the steel lamination for all stator, armature and rotor products. This shielding material separates the rotor's electrically conductive winding from its body.

Temperature ratings
Due to their operating environment, slot insulation must be capable of withstanding high temperatures. In the 1970s, slot insulation materials often had a Class F temperature rating (an operational range up to 155 °C). Today, there are commercially available slot insulation materials with a Class H temperature rating (an operational range up to 180 °C) Its composite of laminate materials, consisting of epoxy, aramid, and dielectric film, create its insulating properties.

Notes

References 

 Payne, B. (2010) The Unsung Hero of Power Generation? The Power Generation Blog. 
 Gerome Technologies Inc. Gerome Technologies U Slot Insulation
 Gibney, J. GE Generators, An Overview.
 PCT. Generator Rotor Slot Insulation.

External links
 Power and Composite Structures. 
 Example Slot Insulation Images

Electrical generators